The following are the association football events of the year 1903 throughout the world.

Events
May 29 – Bradford City Association Football Club founded

Winners club national championship

Hungary:
Hungarian National Championship I: Ferencvárosi TC, first-time champions
Italy:
Italian Football Championship – Genoa C.F.C.
Scotland:
Scottish Division One – Hibernian
Scottish Division Two – Airdrie
Scottish Cup – Rangers

International tournaments
1903 British Home Championship (February 14 – April 4, 1903)

Births
10 January – Matthias Sindelar, Austrian footballer
10 April – Hugh Adcock, British footballer
8 May – Manuel Anatol, French footballer (died 1990)
22 June – George Brown, English footballer
28 June – André Maschinot, French footballer
12 October – Hervé Marc, French footballer
11 November – Albert Barrett, British footballer
18 November – Luigi Allemandi, Italian footballer
21 November – John Bruton, British footballer
27 November – Wim Anderiesen, Dutch footballer (died 1944)

Deaths

Clubs founded
 Bradford City
 Hellas Verona

References 

 
Association football by year